The 10th constituency of Haute-Garonne is a French legislative constituency in the Haute-Garonne département.

It was created in 2010, with the first election in 2012.  It consists of
 Canton of Castanet-Tolosan
 Canton of Revel
and the communes
 Villefranche-de-Lauragais
 Caraman
 Lanta
 Montgiscard
 Nailloux

Deputies

Election Results

2022

 
 
 
 
 
 
 
 
 
|-
| colspan="8" bgcolor="#E9E9E9"|
|-

2017

2012

References

10